William James Winram (January 8, 1838 – February 12, 1891) was a Canadian politician in the province of Manitoba.

Born in Douglas, Isle of Man, as one of a set of twins, the son of James Winram, a shipbuilder, and Annie Hartley, who lived in Ulverston, England, but often traveled back and forth between Liverpool and the Isle of Man, as they had built the ferry which ran between these two ports. Winram was educated at Liverpool Collegiate Institute. He worked for his father as a mechanical engineer until emigrating to Canada and settling in the County of Simcoe, Ontario. In 1878, he moved to Manitoba, where he was a farmer in the Pembina Mountain district.

He was acclaimed to the Legislative Assembly of Manitoba as the Liberal candidate for the electoral district of Dufferin South in 1879 and was re-elected in 1883 and 1886, and then was acclaimed for Manitou in 1888. From August 28, 1888 to February 12, 1891, he was the Speaker of the Legislative Assembly of Manitoba.

Winram was married twice: first to Catherine Ingersoll in 1863 and then to Mary Bannerman in 1863 following his first wife's death.

There still exists a church, St. Mary St. Alban Anglican Church and Cemetery, also known as the Winram Memorial Church, in the Rural District of Pembina, Manitoba, which was erected in his memory.

References

1838 births
1891 deaths
English emigrants to pre-Confederation Ontario
People from Ulverston
People from Douglas, Isle of Man
Speakers of the Legislative Assembly of Manitoba